"Little Nikki Says" is a song by British singer/songwriter Little Nikki. The song was released in the United Kingdom on 6 September 2013 as a digital download through Sony Music Entertainment. The song has peaked to number 53 on the UK Singles Chart.

Music video
A music video to accompany the release of "Little Nikki Says" was first released onto YouTube on 14 July 2013 at a total length of three minutes and sixteen seconds.

Critical reception
Maximum Pop said "'Little Nikki Says' is bursting with energy and raw talent, just like the UK starlett herself. It's got Little Nikki's usual edgy vibe with a chorus to die for. The track is also quite useful for those who are not too talented on the dancefloor, as Nikki gives some instructions on how to get down: "Little Nikki says put your hands up, up, up, up high/ Little Nikki says take your hips down, down, down, down low" but be careful, because if you don't do what Nikki says the track stops and an awesome siren-infused breakdown kicks in.", while Lewis Corner of Digital Spy was less positive, saying "'Little Nikki Says' suffers from a tough case of hit and miss. "Little Nikki says, put your hands up, up, up, up, high/ Little Nikki says, take your hands down, down, round, down, low," she declares on a highly addictive chorus that is unfortunately sandwiched between clunky verses and whirring electronics that feel slightly disjointed. It's not a disaster by any means, but the jury is still out on whether this is enough to make her a household name."

Track listing

Chart performance

Weekly charts

Release history

References

2013 singles
Little Nikki songs
2013 songs
Sony Music UK singles
Songs written by Little Nikki